Levavi is an Israeli surname which means "hearty" and "cordial". Notable people with the surname include:

 Arieh Levavi (1912–2009), Israeli politician

Hebrew-language surnames
Jewish surnames